Stothert & Pitt RFC (Rugby Football Club) is a men's rugby union football club situated at the edge of Bath, in the county of Somerset, UK. The club was formed in 1903 and currently competes in Tribute Somerset Premier - a league at level 8 of the English rugby union system - following their promotion from Tribute Somerset 1 at the end of the 2018–19 season.

Honours

1st XV:
Somerset 2 champions: 1990–91
Somerset Premier champions: 2013–14

2nd XV:
Somerset 3 North champions (2): 2013–14, 2019–20

See also 
 Stothert & Pitt

External links 
 

English rugby union teams
Rugby union in Somerset
Rugby clubs established in 1903
Sport in Bath, Somerset